Franklyn Bellamy (7 March 1886 in Kuala Lumpur – 15 February 1961 in Bodmin) was an English stage and film actor. In 1924 he appeared in Frederick Lonsdale's melodrama The Fake in the West End.

Partial filmography
 For Her People (1914)
 Yellow Stockings (1928)
 Power Over Men (1929)
 Night Birds (1930)
 The Barton Mystery (1932)
 Leap Year (1932)
 Above Rubies (1932)
 The Little Damozel (1933)
 Up for the Derby (1933)
 It's a King (1933)
 Expert's Opinion (1935)
 Member of the Jury (1937)
 Mr. Smith Carries On (1937)
 Splinters in the Air (1937)
 The Last Chance (1937)
 Let's Be Famous (1939)

References

External links

1886 births
1977 deaths
English male film actors
English male stage actors
British people in British Malaya